Bénigne Basset Des Lauriers ( 1639 – 4 August 1699) was born in France and gained historic importance after he emigrated to New France in 1657.

Bénigne Basset was almost immediately involved in the justice system becoming a seigneurial notary and, for a period, a royal notary. He also worked as a surveyor and was responsible for the first street layouts in Montreal in 1672. As a notary there are over 2500 acts that he signed that still exist with his signature.

References
Biography at the Dictionary of Canadian Biography Online
 Vieux - Montreal (French)

1630s births
1699 deaths
People of New France
Year of birth unknown
French urban planners